is a district of Shibuya, Tokyo, Japan.

As of October 2020, the population of this district is 797. The postal code for Udagawachō is 150–0042.

Demography

Education

 operates public elementary and junior high schools.

All of Udagawachō is zoned to Jinnan Elementary School (神南小学校),
 and Shoto Junior High School (松濤中学校).

Notable residents
The poet and painter Yumeji Takehisa resided in Udagawachō from 1921 to 1923.

See also
 Center Gai

References

Neighborhoods of Tokyo
Shibuya